Michael Sheehan Bradley (born July 31, 1987) is an American professional soccer player who plays as a midfielder and captains Toronto FC in Major League Soccer and formerly captained the United States national team.

The son of soccer coach Bob Bradley, he began his professional career with the MetroStars in Major League Soccer in 2004. He then spent several years in Europe, playing in the Dutch Eredivisie with Heerenveen, German Bundesliga with Borussia Mönchengladbach, English Premier League with Aston Villa and Italian Serie A with Chievo and Roma. He returned to MLS with Toronto FC in 2014, making over 250 total appearances and winning the MLS Cup in 2017.

Since his debut in 2006, Bradley has made over 150 appearances for the United States men's national soccer team. He was selected for tournaments including five CONCACAF Gold Cups and two FIFA World Cups, winning two of the former and finishing as runner-up at the 2009 FIFA Confederations Cup.

Early life
Bradley was born in Princeton, New Jersey, son to Bob Bradley, former coach of the United States national team and Los Angeles FC. While his father was the head soccer coach at Princeton University, the family lived in Pennington, New Jersey.

Michael spent his teenage years in Palatine, Illinois while his father coached the Chicago Fire of Major League Soccer (MLS), and he grew up playing for Sockers FC, who went to the 2002 National Championships and finished third. He later attended the United States Under-17 Men's National Team Residency Program in Bradenton, Florida – the dedicated facility for the training of the under-17 national team – for four semesters, from 2002 to 2004. As a child, he idolized Roy Keane, the Manchester United and Republic of Ireland midfielder.

Club career

MetroStars
Before leaving Bradenton, Bradley signed a Project-40 contract with MLS, turning professional at the age of sixteen, and entered the 2004 MLS SuperDraft, where he was selected thirty-sixth overall by the MetroStars, who at the time were coached by his father. Bradley did not see any playing time in his rookie season, missing out with a foot injury, but went on to gain a starting spot in 2005, playing 30 out of 32 matches for the Metro. Just weeks after his father was fired as the club's coach, he headed in his first professional goal in a victory over Chivas USA on the last day of the 2005 season, sending the team to the playoffs.

SC Heerenveen
In January 2006, Bradley became the youngest MLS player to ever be sold when he was transferred to Heerenveen for $250,000 and a portion of any sell-on fee His first start for the Dutch club came on April 16, 2006, in a match against AZ. He found success early, earning five starts and helping the club to a coveted UEFA Cup spot in his first half-season. Upon the retirement of Paul Bosvelt after the 2006–07 season, Bradley took the veteran's starting place in central midfield. Bradley scored sixteen Eredivisie goals and twenty in all competitions during the 2007–08 season.

In January 2008, Bradley broke the record for the most goals scored in a single season by an American soccer player playing in a European first division, which was previously held by Brian McBride with his thirteen goals for Fulham in the Premier League. On January 26, 2008, Bradley extended his record to eighteen, with sixteen league goals.

Borussia Mönchengladbach

2008–2011

On August 31, 2008, Bradley signed a four-year deal with Bundesliga side Borussia Mönchengladbach for an undisclosed fee. It was later revealed that Bradley had agreed to a switch to English club Birmingham City on the condition that the club retained its Premier League status. However, they did not and he made his Gladbach debut on September 20 in a loss against Hertha Berlin. On November 15, 2008, Bradley scored his first goal for Mönchengladbach against Bundesliga powerhouse Bayern Munich with an eighty-first minute equalizing header. The game ended 2–2.

Early in the 2009–10 season, Bradley was briefly suspended after an argument with manager Michael Frontzeck over playing time. However, the two later reconciled and Bradley re-established himself as a starter with the club before assisting a goal against Bayern Munich with a one-touch volley pass, and scoring the winning goal on a low free kick against Hannover 96. On January 30, 2011, Aston Villa of the Premier League confirmed via their official website that they were in talks to sign Bradley on a loan deal until the end of the 2010–11 season.

Loan to Aston Villa
Bradley completed the loan deal to Aston Villa on January 31, 2011. Bradley was paraded in front of the fans at Villa Park on February 5 before kick off of the Premier League match against Fulham. On February 12, Bradley made his Aston Villa debut, coming on in the second half after Jean Makoun was sent off. It was said that Bradley would not join Villa on a permanent basis after Alex McLeish declined to extend his contract. He made only three Premier League appearances and one FA Cup appearance.

Chievo
Bradley joined Italian Serie A club Chievo on August 31, 2011. He made his Chievo debut on September 18, coming on in the second half for Paolo Sammarco. He has been nicknamed "The General" by the local fans. Bradley scored his first goal in Italian soccer in a 3–2 victory over Catania on April 7 to take his side up to ninth in the league standings.

Roma
On July 16, 2012, Bradley joined Roma, signing a four-year contract for a transfer fee of €3.75 million. On July 17, 2012, Bradley made his debut for Roma as a starter in a 2–1 victory against fellow U.S. national team member Terrence Boyd of the Austrian Football Bundesliga club, Rapid Wien. On July 25, 2012, Bradley scored his first goal for Roma in a club friendly against Liverpool at Fenway Park in Boston. On August 19, Bradley scored his second pre-season goal against Greek club Aris. On August 26, Bradley made his league debut as a starter for Roma in their 2–2 draw against Catania; he picked up the assist in Roma's game-tying goal in the 90th minute. On October 7, 2012, in his first game back after a month-long groin injury, Bradley scored his first goal for the Giallorossi in Roma's 2–0 win over Atalanta.

In late January 2013, Bradley received praise from freelance writer for ESPN.com Michael Cox, stating that Serie A are choosing midfielders like Bradley who "epitomizes the new breed of Serie A midfielder, who's all about energy and hard running, rather than the typical number 10." On May 26, 2013, Bradley started in midfield for Roma as the club fell 1–0 to Rome rivals S.S. Lazio in the final of the Coppa Italia.

On September 6, Bradley was sidelined due to an injury he suffered on national team duty against Costa Rica. He returned to action for Roma on October 27, where he scored a goal against Udinese, the only goal either side scored during the match.

Toronto FC

On January 9, 2014, AS Roma announced the sale of Bradley to Toronto FC of Major League Soccer for $10 million. As part of the transfer, the two clubs agreed to a partnership including two friendly matches at BMO Field over six years, and a player development program for Toronto FC players at Roma's training facility.

Bradley made his debut with Toronto in their season opener at Seattle Sounders FC on March 15, 2014, the game ended in a 2–1 away victory with both goals coming from newly acquired Jermain Defoe. He scored his first goal for Toronto three weeks later on April 5 against the Columbus Crew, a game which ended in a 2–0 away victory.

He was named captain prior to the 2015 season.

Bradley captained and scored once for Toronto FC in the 2016 Eastern Conference Finals in a derby against Montreal Impact in which Toronto won on an aggregated score of 7–5, to take Toronto FC to the MLS Cup Final for the first time in their history. On December 10, 2016, Toronto lost the final at home to the Seattle Sounders 5–4 in penalty shoot-out following a goalless draw after extra-time in which Seattle had no shots on target; Bradley missed Toronto's second penalty.

The arrival of Spanish playmaker Victor Vázquez in midfield at the beginning of the 2017 season saw less of a burden placed on Bradley and star forward Sebastian Giovinco to create goalscoring opportunities for Toronto; furthermore, Greg Vanney's switch in tactics from a 4–4–2 diamond to a 3–5–2 formation often saw Bradley occupy more of a supporting role in midfield, which left the Spaniard free to take on the majority of playmaking duties, although the midfield duo often switched positions and effectively shared the team's defensive and creative responsibilities, forming a notable partnership throughout the season. On June 27, Toronto defeated Montreal 2–1 at home in the second leg of the 2017 Canadian Championship final to capture the title for the second consecutive season, edging Montreal 3–2 on aggregate. On September 30, 2017, Bradley won his first Supporters' Shield with a 4–2 home win over New York Red Bulls, to clinch top of the league with the most points that season. On December 9, 2017, Bradley helped Toronto defeat Seattle 2–0 in the 2017 MLS Cup at BMO Field, to lift the title for the first time in the club's history, and complete an unprecedented domestic treble.

After a 2–1 home loss to Guadalajara on April 18, in the first leg of the 2018 CONCACAF Champions League Finals, Toronto managed a 2–1 away win in the return leg on April 25, which took the match straight to penalty shoot-out; Bradley missed the decisive spot kick as Toronto lost the shoot-out 4–2.

On March 2, 2019, Bradley scored a brace for Toronto in their 3–1 win away against Philadelphia Union to kick off Toronto FC's regular Major League Soccer season. He made his 200th appearance for the club on November 10, a 3–1 away defeat to Seattle Sounders in the 2019 MLS Cup Final.

At the beginning of 2020, he had ankle surgery and was expected to miss a significant portion of the season. However, due to the COVID-19 pandemic interrupting the MLS season, he only missed two games and was able to return upon the league restart in the MLS is Back Tournament.

In 2022, Bradley scored a brace against Charlotte FC in a 4-0 home win that saw the debuts of Lorenzo Insigne and Federico Bernardeschi, both of whom assisted on Bradley's goals. The performance led Bradley to be voted MLS Player of the Week.

International career

In May 2006, Bradley was brought into the 2006 World Cup training camp to train with the United States national team. While not a member of the World Cup squad or an alternate, Bradley was on the roster for the three send-off friendlies played before the tournament. He earned his first cap in the May 26 match against Venezuela in Cleveland.

In late 2006 Bob Bradley, Michael's father, was hired as head coach of the national team, and Michael established himself as a key player for the U.S. during his father's tenure. Bradley earned his first international start on March 28, 2007, during a friendly against Guatemala. He was a starter at the 2007 CONCACAF Gold Cup and helped lead the U.S. to the title, though he was sent off for a late tackle in the semi-final against Canada. The next month, he started every match for the U.S. at the 2007 FIFA U-20 World Cup, where he scored the game-winning goal in the 107th minute against Uruguay in the round of 16. He scored his first senior international goal on October 17, 2007, with a game-winner in the 87th minute against Switzerland in a friendly in Basel. Following these performances, Bradley was named U.S. Soccer's Young Athlete of the Year for 2007. Against Mexico in Columbus, Ohio on February 11, 2009 in a 2010 FIFA World Cup qualifier, Bradley scored both goals in a 2–0 victory.

During the United States' surprise run to the final of the 2009 FIFA Confederations Cup, Bradley scored the second goal against Egypt off an assist from Landon Donovan, helping the Americans advance to the semi-final on goal differential after beating the Egyptians 3–0. He started in the 2–0 upset victory against Spain in the semi-final, but was sent off late in the game. The resulting suspension kept Bradley out of the tournament final, which the U.S. lost 3–2 to Brazil. Bradley was later reported to have confronted referee Jorge Larrionda following the match, resulting in him receiving an additional three-match suspension to be served during the 2009 CONCACAF Gold Cup.

Bradley was a key player for the U.S. in the 2010 FIFA World Cup in South Africa, starting all four matches in central midfield. In the group stage, he scored the equalizer in a comeback 2–2 draw against Slovenia. He captained the national team for the first time in an August 10, 2010 friendly against Brazil in his birthplace of New Jersey. In the 2011 CONCACAF Gold Cup Bradley featured in each game in a new midfield partnership with Jermaine Jones, and scored the opening goal in the final against Mexico, though the United States went on to lose 4–2.

Following the Gold Cup loss, Bob Bradley was fired as national team coach and replaced by Jürgen Klinsmann under whom Michael remained a key starter in midfield. He started each game for the U.S. at the 2014 FIFA World Cup in Brazil.

After U.S. Soccer removed the captaincy from Clint Dempsey as punishment for a controversial incident with a referee before the 2015 Gold Cup, Klinsmann named Bradley the national team's new permanent captain. In the opening game against Honduras on July 7, Bradley earned his 100th cap at the age of 27.

On July 7, 2019 Bradley played as the U.S. lost the final of the 2019 CONCACAF Gold Cup by a single goal to Mexico. He became the third American to 150 caps, after Cobi Jones and Landon Donovan.

Style of play
A hard-working, intelligent, and physically imposing right-footed player, Bradley is capable of playing in several midfield roles, and has been used in the center, in a holding role, in a box-to-box role, in the hole, or even in a more withdrawn creative role as a deep-lying playmaker; his tenacity, ball-winning abilities, energy, tactical intelligence, and positional sense enable him to recover the ball and quickly transition from defense to attack by making forward runs, while his vision and range of passing allow him to dictate the tempo of his team's play in midfield or create goalscoring opportunities after retrieving possession. In addition to his stamina and playing ability, he is also known for his communication and leadership skills. He has also been used as a central defender on occasion.

Personal life
Bradley speaks fluent English, Italian, Dutch, German, and Spanish. He is married to Amanda, a former University of Rhode Island tennis player. The couple have a son and a daughter, born in 2012 and 2014 respectively.

Bradley is the son of soccer coach Bob Bradley, who managed teams including the United States men's national team. Scott Bradley, the younger brother of Bob and uncle of Michael, played as a catcher in Major League Baseball, primarily for the Seattle Mariners, and served as long-time coach of the Princeton Tigers. Michael Bradley's sister married the Australian-born soccer player Andy Rose.

Career statistics

Club

International

Scores and results list United States's goal tally first, score column indicates score after each Bradley goal.

Honors
Roma
 Coppa Italia runner-up: 2012–13

Toronto FC
 MLS Cup: 2017; runner-up: 2016, 2019
 Eastern Conference (Playoffs): 2016, 2017, 2019
Supporters' Shield: 2017
 Canadian Championship: 2016, 2017, 2018, 2020; runner-up: 2019
 CONCACAF Champions League runner-up: 2018
Campeones Cup runner-up: 2018
United States
 CONCACAF Gold Cup: 2007, 2017; runner-up: 2011, 2019
 FIFA Confederations Cup runner-up: 2009
Individual
 CONCACAF Men's Best XI: 2015, 2018
 IFFHS CONCACAF Team of the Decade: 2011–2020
U.S. Soccer Athlete of the Year: 2015
CONCACAF Gold Cup Golden Ball: 2017
 CONCACAF Gold Cup Best XI: 2017, 2019
MLS All-Star: 2014, 2015, 2017
 Fútbol de Primera Player of the Year: 2015
Red Patch Boys Player of the Year: 2014

See also 
 List of men's footballers with 100 or more international caps

References

External links

 
 
 
 

1987 births
Living people
People from Palatine, Illinois
People from Pennington, New Jersey
People from Princeton, New Jersey
Sportspeople from Mercer County, New Jersey
Soccer players from New Jersey
American soccer players
Association football midfielders
Parade High School All-Americans (boys' soccer)
Chicago Sockers players
IMG Academy alumni
New York Red Bulls draft picks
New York Red Bulls players
SC Heerenveen players
Borussia Mönchengladbach players
Aston Villa F.C. players
A.C. ChievoVerona players
A.S. Roma players
Toronto FC players
Major League Soccer players
Major League Soccer All-Stars
Designated Players (MLS)
Eredivisie players
Bundesliga players
Premier League players
Serie A players
United States men's youth international soccer players
United States men's under-20 international soccer players
United States men's under-23 international soccer players
Olympic soccer players of the United States
United States men's international soccer players
2007 CONCACAF Gold Cup players
Footballers at the 2008 Summer Olympics
2009 FIFA Confederations Cup players
2010 FIFA World Cup players
2011 CONCACAF Gold Cup players
2014 FIFA World Cup players
2015 CONCACAF Gold Cup players
Copa América Centenario players
2017 CONCACAF Gold Cup players
2019 CONCACAF Gold Cup players
CONCACAF Gold Cup-winning players
FIFA Century Club
American expatriate soccer players
American expatriate sportspeople in the Netherlands
American expatriate soccer players in Germany
American expatriate sportspeople in England
American expatriate sportspeople in Italy
American expatriate sportspeople in Canada
Expatriate footballers in the Netherlands
Expatriate footballers in England
Expatriate footballers in Italy
Expatriate soccer players in Canada